Pukeokahu is a rural community in the Rangitikei District and Manawatū-Whanganui region of New Zealand's North Island.

It centres around popular spot on the Rangitikei River, at River Valley Lodge, which is used for rafting, swimming, brown trout fishing and picnics. The condition of the spot changes from week to week, there is ongoing overall bacteria risk for swimmers. Kayak manufacturer Bliss-stick is based here.

The River Valley Lodge offers guided rafting, wooden boat tours, and horse treks. It has also partnered with the Māori owners of the Aorangi Mountain to the west to provide one-day hiking trips. However, the company often struggles to recruit rafting guides due to the area's isolation and lack of housing.

Geography

The Pukeokahu area includes Pukeokahu Station farm, a  site next to the Rangitikei River, dominated by Pukeokahu Hill. The top of the hills is 983 metres above sea level, with sharp drops to the river, Okoeke and Ngutuwhero Streams and rolling countryside. The farm holds 10,000 stock, including sheep, cattle, and deer. The farm was sold to Germany investors in 2012 for $8.7 million.

Other prominent farms include Kaiangaroa Station, a  sheep-and-beef property, and Mangaohane Station, 4800 hectare sheep and cattle farm wintering 44,000 stock.

There are also several Māori land blocks in the area, including the  site to the north shared by 74 owners, and a  site directly east across the river from the River Valley Lodge, which has 400 registered owners.

History

The area was struck by destructive snow storms in 2002 and 2017.

An annual race between a horse and a human has been held in Pukeokahu since 2015, based on a Welsh event started in 1980.

In 2016, fashion designer Kate Megaw credited her upbringing in Pukeokahu as the inspiration for her show at New Zealand Fashion Week.

A summer storm in late 2018 pushed farm silt and sediment into the river, depleting farm topsoil and feeding river weeds.

Education

The school looks out over Mt Aorangi and Pukeokahu Hill. It holds annual pet days and has held annual horse treks since 2001.

Richie McCaw visited the school by helicopter in 2011 after the school won a national competition.

In 2017, the school's sole charge principal regularly from  outside Feilding. The school applied for a new sole charge principal in 2020.

References

Hill Country stations
Rangitikei District
Populated places in Manawatū-Whanganui